Sofia Ivanova (Bulgarian: София Иванова; born 15 September 2005) is a Bulgarian rhythmic gymnast. She is a world champion with the Bulgarian team in World Championships 2022 in Sofia and world champion with 3 ribbons+2 balls. She won gold in the senior team competition at the 2022 European Championships.

Career

Junior 
She first entered the spotlight in 2017, when she entered the national team and started to attend competitions abroad.

Senior 
In 2021 Ivanova started competing in the senior category, winning bronze in the national championship and gold in the team competition. She competed at minor tournaments, like the Sofia cup and the Irina Deleanu cup as she was not considered among the top individuals.

In late 2021 Ivanova was included in the group. In 2022, when the girls of the previous group retired after becoming Olympic champions, she became a starter in the two routines. Her first competition was the Grand Prix in Marbella, Spain. The group then took part in the World Cup stages in Sofia (All-Around and 5 hoops gold, silver with 3 ribbons + 2 balls), Tashkent (All-Around and 5 hoops gold, bronze with 3 ribbons + 2 balls), Pesaro (All-Around and  3 ribbons + 2 balls silver and 5 hoops bronze), Pamplona (bronze with 5 hoops and silver with  3 ribbons + 2 balls) and Cluji-Napoca (All-Around, 5 hoops and 3 ribbons + 2 balls gold). In June she was part of the group for the European Championship in Tel Aviv, she won gold in the senior team category along with Vaya Draganova, Zhenina Trashlieva, Kamelia Petrova, Rachel Stoyanov, Margarita Vasileva and the individuals Boryana Kaleyn and Stiliana Nikolova.

References 

2005 births
Living people
Bulgarian rhythmic gymnasts
Medalists at the Rhythmic Gymnastics European Championships
Medalists at the Rhythmic Gymnastics World Championships